İhsaniye can refer to:

 İhsaniye
 İhsaniye, Düzce
 İhsaniye, İnegöl
 İhsaniye, İznik